The Links Invitation Open was a golf tournament on the LPGA Tour, played only in 1959. It was played at the Continental Colony Club in Atlanta, Georgia. Beverly Hanson won the event.

References

Former LPGA Tour events
Golf in Georgia (U.S. state)
Women's sports in Georgia (U.S. state)